The Kustomonsters is an animated web series and TV show created by, Craig Clark, an art rock, darkwave musician (Chorus of Souls on Fluxus Records), animator (Forrest Gump and The Simpsons). Clark produced the series as a compilation of his short films from 1983 to 2012. The show also features short films from many other independent animators such as Michel Gagne, Mark Kausler, Mike Milo and Aaron Long,  as well as many alternative music videos from bands like Celldweller, Monica Richards, and Shiny Toy Guns.

The show is a high octane zany comedy take blending the 60's “Kustom Car Kulture” of Ed Daddy Roth with the classic lovable spookiness of Hollywood horror monsters and vintage cartoons. “Mummy DaddyO” is the friendly “horror host” and lead hipster of this motley bunch from Horror Heights. His sidekick, “Butterball the Skeleton”, joins animated puppet DaddyO as he hosts the show from the Ends Ville Coffeehouse.

The show currently airs in syndication on the AMGTV network in the U.S. and streams on-line at www.kustomonsters.com as well as Kustomonsters on Vimeo Clark also released a Kustomonsters feature film via Vimeo ON Demand in 2015.

External links
 official website
 Kustomonsters on YouTube
 Kustomonsters on IMDB
 Kustomonsters on Vimeo

References
Pink Slip Animation
Cheeky Entertainment

American animated web series
Flash animated web series